The Ausa or Aussa is a river in the Italian province of Udine. Its source is near the city of Udine. The river flows south past Palmanova, Aiello del Friuli, Cervignano del Friuli and Terzo d'Aquileia before emptying into the Laguna di Marano between Marano Lagunare and Aquileia.

References

Rivers of the Province of Udine
Rivers of Italy
Adriatic Italian coast basins